A demerger is a form of corporate restructuring in which the entity's business operations are segregated into one or more components. It is the converse of a merger or acquisition.

A demerger can take place through a spin-off by distributed or transferring the shares in a subsidiary holding the business to company shareholders carrying out the demerger. The demerger can also occur by transferring the relevant business to a new company or business to which then that company's shareholders are issued shares of. In contrast, divestment can also "undo" a merger or acquisition, but the assets are sold off rather than retained under a renamed corporate entity. 

Demergers can be undertaken for various business and non-business reasons, such as government intervention, by way of antitrust law, or through decartelization.

See also  
 Equity carve-out
Successor company

References

Corporate finance
Restructuring